The European Skat Championship has been held biennially since 1979 by the world Skat organisation, the International Skat Players Association (ISPA), at various locations. It alternates with the World Skat Championship which has also been run biennially since 1978 by the same association. In addition to the title of European Skat Champion there are awards for a European Women's Champion, a European Youth Champion, a European Veteran's Champion and a European Women Veteran's Champion.

In the 2009 European Skat Championship in Graz, Claudia Knape won the final against the men and became the  European Skat Champion. The women’s title was awarded to Martina Schmidt, who had won it by being better placed against Knape (M. Schmidt 9th, C. Knape 16th) in the preliminary rounds.

In addition, since 1981 there has been an award for the best team and the best mixed team. From 1995 there has been an award for best nation.

Championships and winners

External links 
 List of ISPA European champions
 European Skat champions at Skatwelt.net

Skat (card game)
European championships